Paul Wallace (born 4 May 1962) is a former Irish first-class cricketer.

Wallace was born at Derry and educated at Templemore Secondary School. Playing club cricket for St Johnston and Brigade Cricket Club, Wallace made a single appearance in first-class cricket for Ireland against Scotland at Dumfries in 1988. Bowling with his left-arm fast-medium, Wallace took the wickets of David Snodgrass and Jack Ker in Scotland's first-innings, ending with figures of 2/91 from 25 overs. With the bat, he was dismissed without scoring in Ireland's first-innings be James Govan, and when asked to follow-on, he was again dismissed by the same bowler without scoring. He did not feature for Ireland again after this match. Outside of cricket, Wallace owns a conservatory installation company.

References

External links

1962 births
Living people
Sportspeople from Derry (city)
Cricketers from Northern Ireland
Irish cricketers